The 2014 Mid-Eastern Athletic Conference women's basketball tournament took place March 10–15, 2014, at the Norfolk Scope in Norfolk, Virginia. 2014 will be the second year in Norfolk after the last eight years in Winston-Salem, North Carolina. First round games will be played March 10 and March 11, with the quarterfinal games played on March 12 and 13. The semifinals will be held March 14, with the championship game on March 15.

Bracket

References

External links
 Official site

2013–14 NCAA Division I women's basketball season
MEAC women's basketball tournament
MEAC
Basketball competitions in Norfolk, Virginia
College basketball tournaments in Virginia
Women's sports in Virginia